Amelia City is an unincorporated community in Nassau County, Florida, United States. It is located in the southern half of Amelia Island, on A1A near the Amelia River.

Geography

References

Unincorporated communities in Nassau County, Florida
Beaches of Nassau County, Florida
Unincorporated communities in the Jacksonville metropolitan area
Unincorporated communities in Florida
Populated coastal places in Florida on the Atlantic Ocean
Beaches of Florida
Amelia Island